Hope Scope is an album by David Murray's Octet recorded in 1987 and be released on the Italian Black Saint label in 1991. It features Murray's Octet and includes performances by Murray, Rasul Siddik, Hugh Ragin, Craig Harris, James Spaulding, Dave Burrell, Wilber Morris and Ralph Peterson, Jr.

Reception
The Allmusic review by Scott Yanow awarded the album 4½ stars, stating: "This spirited set has tributes to Ben Webster and Lester Young but is at its best when the full ensemble (trumpeters Hugh Ragin and Rasul Siddik, trombonist Craig Harris, altoist James Spaulding, pianist Dave Burrell, bassist Wilber Morris and drummer Ralph Peterson, Jr., along with the leader on tenor and bass clarinet) get to improvise together. This is one of their strongest all-round recordings with 'Hope Scope' being a particular highpoint."

Track listing
All compositions by David Murray except as indicated
 "Ben" - 7:41  
 "Same Places New Faces" (Craig Harris) - 9:03  
 "Hope Scope" - 8:23  
 "Lester" - 8:27  
 "Thabo" (Ralph Peterson, Jr.) - 9:54

Personnel
David Murray - tenor saxophone, bass clarinet
Rasul Siddik - trumpet
Hugh Ragin - trumpet
Craig Harris - trombone
James Spaulding - alto saxophone
Dave Burrell - piano
Wilber Morris - bass
Ralph Peterson, Jr. - drums

References 

1991 albums
David Murray (saxophonist) albums
Black Saint/Soul Note albums